The 2019 Mackay Cutters season was the 12th in the club's history. Coached by Steve Sheppard and captained by Cooper Bambling, they competed in the QRL's Intrust Super Cup. The club missed the finals for the sixth consecutive season, finishing in 11th place.

Season summary
After another last place finish in 2018, the Cutters underwent another roster overhaul, losing both starting front rowers, Nick Brown and Jordan Grant, to the Redcliffe Dolphins and key outside backs Nicho Hynes and Nathan Saumalu to the Sunshine Coast Falcons. In turn, they recruited former Super League players Alex Gerrard and Lloyd White from the Widnes Vikings, Sam Cook from the New Zealand Warriors, and Ross Bella, Paul Byrnes, Jordan Kenworthy and David Munro from the Townsville Blackhawks.

The club endured another tough season on the field, winning just three of their first 10 games. Four wins from their final 13 games followed and the club finished the year in 11th spot, three places higher than in 2018. Following the last game of the season, the club announced that head coach Steve Sheppard would leave the club, after three years in charge of the side.

New recruit Jordan Kenworthy was awarded the club's Player of the Year and Players' Player awards.

Squad List

2019 squad

Squad movement

Gains

Losses

Fixtures

Regular season

Statistics

Honours

Club
Player of the Year: Jordan Kenworthy
Players' Player: Jordan Kenworthy
Rookie of the Year: Reuben Cotter
Club Person of the Year: Ronan Curtis

References

2019 in Australian rugby league
2019 in rugby league by club
Mackay Cutters